Johny Léonard (born 3 October 1941) was a Luxembourgish footballer who played as a striker.

Club career
Léonard played for US Luxembourg, Metz and K.A.A. Gent.

International career
A striker, Léonard won 32 caps for Luxembourg over a period of eight years, and scored eight goals in the process.

References

External links
 

1941 births
Living people
People from Differdange
Association football forwards
Luxembourgian footballers
Luxembourgian expatriate footballers
Luxembourg international footballers
FC Metz players
Ligue 1 players
Expatriate footballers in France
K.A.A. Gent players
Expatriate footballers in Belgium
Luxembourgian expatriate sportspeople in France
Luxembourgian expatriate sportspeople in Belgium
Belgian Pro League players
Challenger Pro League players